Santa María Ananúñez is a village located in the municipality of Melgar de Fernamental, in Burgos province, Castile and León, Spain. As of 2020, it has a population of 12.

Geography 
Santa María Ananúñez is located 66km west-northwest of Burgos.

References

Populated places in the Province of Burgos